Zamia melanorrhachis is a species of plant in the family Zamiaceae. It is native to Colombia and Peru. It is known commonly as corocito.

This plant grows in fragmented transitional forest habitat.

References

melanorrhachis
Endangered plants
Flora of Colombia
Flora of Peru
Taxonomy articles created by Polbot